The Secunderabad–Lokmanya Tilak Terminus Duronto Express is a Superfast Express train under Duronto category that operates between  and Lokmanya Tilak Terminus.

The service is operated by South Central Railway zone of Indian Railways and connects the Indian states of Telangana & Maharashtra using train numbers 12220 (Secunderabad–Mumbai (LTT)) and 12219 (Mumbai (LTT)–Secunderabad) respectively

Service

The train offers only air-conditioned coaches. Its length generally comprises 1 AC 1st-class coach, 3 AC 2-tier coaches and  9 AC 3-tier coaches for passengers, generator coaches on either ends for powering the AC and a pantry car for catering services

As is customary with most train services in India, coach composition may be amended at the discretion of Indian Railways depending on demand.

Operation

The 12220 Secunderabad–Mumbai (LTT) Duronto Express starts from Secunderabad Junction every Tuesday & Friday night reaching Lokmanya Tilak Terminus the next day.
The 12219 Lokmanya Tilak Terminus–Secunderabad Duronto starts from Lokmanya Tilak Terminus every Wednesday & Saturday night reaching Secunderabad Junction the next day.

Routing and halts

Being a Duronto Express train, it has  commercial halts at Pune Junction and Solapur between its terminal stops.

Traction

As the total route is electrified it will be hauled end-to-end by a Lallaguda-based WAP-7 for its entire journey.

Speed
The maximum permissible speed of the train is up to 110 kmph except some parts. Its all coaches are of air conditioned LHB coach type which is capable of reaching 160 kmph but it does not touch. Sometimes people become confused because according to Indian Railways Permanent Way Manual (IRPWM) on Indian Railways website or Indian Railway Institute of Civil Engineering website, the BG (Broad Gauge) lines have been classified into six groups ‘A’ to ‘E’ on the basis of the future maximum permissible speeds but it may not be same as present speed.

105 kmph between Lokmanya Tilak T and Karjat as it is about whole part of Mumbai  Karjat route having speed of 105 kmph, 80 kmph in Karjat Palasdari only 3 km long route, 60 kmph in Palasdari Lonavala 25 km long ghat (hill) route, 110 kmph in Lonavala Wadi route, Wadi Vikarabad Secunderabad is unknown.

Accidents

 On 4 May 2014, the 12220 Secunderabad–Lokmanya Tilak Terminus Duronto Express collided with a tractor trailer near  killing 3 persons & seriously wounding 8.
 On 12 September 2015, 12220 Secunderabad–Mumbai Duronto Express Express derailed at Martur station between Shahbad and Gulbarga on Solapur Division in Karnataka at around 2:15 am. Two passengers were killed and more than 30 injured when eight of its coaches were derailed.

See also

Lokmanya Tilak Terminus
Visakhapatnam–Secunderabad Duronto Express
Secunderabad–Hazrat Nizamuddin Duronto Express
Secunderabad railway station

References

External links

Transport in Mumbai
Transport in Secunderabad
Duronto Express trains
Rail transport in Telangana
Rail transport in Maharashtra
Railway services introduced in 2011
2011 establishments in India